Smith's Laws is a ten volume collection of certain laws in the Province and Commonwealth of Pennsylvania from 1700 through 1829.

See also
 Law of Pennsylvania

References

Government of Pennsylvania
Pennsylvania law